The Cyclopædia of Biblical, Theological and Ecclesiastical Literature is a reference work of ten volumes and two supplements published in the late 19th century, co-authored by John McClintock, academic and minister, and James Strong, professor of exegetical theology. The volumes were published by Harper and Brothers of New York.

Scope 

As an encyclopaedia, the authors set out to create a scholarly work, but accessible to the non-expert, designed to be
Topics covered in the volumes include descriptions of proper names, locations, events, theological concepts, histories of the Christian Churches, and biographical sketches of notable religious figures.

Volumes 

 Volume I.—A, B 
 Volume II.—C, D
 Volume III.—E, F, G
 Volume IV.—H, I, J
 Volume V.—K, L, Mc
 Volume VI.—Me–Nev 
 Volume VII.—New–Pes 
 Volume VIII.—Pet–Re
 Volume IX.—Rh–St
 Volume X.—Su–Z
 Supplement, Vol. I.—A–Cn
 Supplement, Vol. II.—Co–Z

References

External links
 Cyclopaedia of Biblical, Theological and Ecclesiastical Literature, 1867–1887, via the Hathi Trust Digital Library.
 McClintock and Strong Biblical Cyclopedia

19th-century books
Christian encyclopedias
Reference works in the public domain